Alexandra Najarro (born June 3, 1993) is a Canadian former competitive figure skater. She placed 13th at the 2012 Four Continents Championships.

Personal life 
Najarro was born on June 3, 1993 in Richmond Hill, Ontario, Canada. Fluent in English and French, she also speaks Polish and Spanish, the mother tongues of her parents.

Career 
Najarro began skating at age five at the Mississauga Figure Skating Club with her mother Eva as her coach. She appeared in the small role of Snowplow Sam in the 2005 Disney movie Ice Princess.

Najarro won the 2008 Canadian national novice title and began appearing on the ISU Junior Grand Prix series the following season.

Najarro placed fourth at the 2011 and 2012 Canadian Championships. She was selected to represent Canada at the 2012 Four Continents Championships in Colorado Springs, Colorado; she placed 14th in the short program, 12th in the free skate, and 13th overall.

Najarro did not compete in the 2012–13 season. She placed sixth at the 2014 Canadian Championships.

Programs

Competitive highlights 
JGP: Junior Grand Prix

References

External links 
 

1993 births
Canadian female single skaters
Living people
Sportspeople from Richmond Hill, Ontario